The 1972 Pot Black was a professional invitational snooker tournament, which was broadcast in 1972. The tournament was held between 29 December 1971 and 1 January 1972 in the Pebble Mill Studios in Birmingham, and featured six professional players. All matches were one-frame shoot-outs.

Broadcasts were on BBC2 and started at 21:00 on Wednesday 12 April 1972 The tournament this year was reduced to 6 players. There was a qualifying stage in which each competitor played three matches. The leading four then played in a round-robin group with the top two players qualifying for the final. Alan Weeks presented the programme with Ted Lowe as commentator and Sydney Lee as referee.

The tournament featured its first overseas player making his TV debut, Australia's Eddie Charlton who went on to win the tournament beating Ray Reardon 88–27 in the final broadcast  on 26 July.

Main draw

Qualifying Group

Round-Robin

Final

References

Pot Black
1972 in snooker
1972 in English sport